Miss Sharon Jones! is a 2015 documentary film about the singer Sharon Jones. The film depicts Jones' battle with cancer while continuing to perform with her group the Dap-Kings.

Reception
Miss Sharon Jones! has received mostly positive reviews from critics. Review aggregator Rotten Tomatoes gives the film an approval rating of 87%, based on 38 reviews, with an average rating of 7.3/10. On Metacritic, the film has a score of 77 out of 100, based on 15 critics, indicating "generally favorable reviews".

Soundtrack

The soundtrack to the film was released by Daptone on August 19, 2016. The album compiles songs from the three previous studio albums by Sharon Jones & the Dap-Kings: 100 Days, 100 Nights (2007), I Learned the Hard Way (2010), and Give the People What They Want (2014).

Track listing
 Tell Me 	
 Retreat!
 Genuine Pt. 1
 Longer and Stronger
 If You Call
 100 Days, 100 Nights
 People Don't Get What They Deserve
 Humble Me
 I'll Still Be True
 Let Them Knock
 Stranger to My Happiness
 Keep on Looking
 Mama Don't Like My Man
 I Learned the Hard Way
 Slow Down, Love
 I'm Still Here

References

External links
 
 

2015 films
2015 documentary films
2016 albums
Sharon Jones & The Dap-Kings albums
Daptone Records albums
American documentary films
Films directed by Barbara Kopple
Documentary films about women in music
Documentary films about cancer
Films set in Brooklyn
2010s English-language films
2010s American films